Kristopher J. Battles is an American artist, known as the last remaining USMC combat artist in 2010.

Military career
Battles joined the Corps in 1986. He served as a computer operator, combat correspondent and chaplain's assistant. He had to reenlist for active duty as a combat artist.

War artist
The United States Marine Corps supported more than 70 war artists in World War II; and the number of combat artists has declined since the end of the Vietnam War.  In July 2010, the Corps supports only one last combat artist. Unless something happens, Sergeant Battles will become notable as the last of his kind.

Since World War I, a long line of American servicemen-artists have produced artwork based on their experiences in combat. The USMC artists have documented the life of Marines in the field. Like his predecessors, Sgt. Battles' artwork develops during a process of "balancing a tactical eye as a Marine" with the "artist's visual eye" and also noticing the way the light is bouncing off the body armor.  Battles' deployment to Iraq gave him a sharper eye for what can be portrayed in a combat zone.

"Go to war, do art" is the motto of a Marine combat artist. The mission is to capture images of war on canvases and sketchpads.

Honors
 2010: United States Marine Corps Combat Correspondents Association, Merit Award, First Place Combat Art.

See also

 War artist
 American official war artists
 Michael D. Fay

Notes

References
 Sanborn, James K.  "Heroics illustrated, comic-book style," Marine Corps Times. March 24, 2010.

External links
  Sketchpad Warrior blog

American war artists
United States Marines
Living people
Truman State University alumni
Year of birth missing (living people)